The Canadian Hockey League awards sixteen annual trophies for accomplishments during the regular and at the Memorial Cup to top individuals and teams among its three member leagues. The Memorial Cup is the top award for the championship team at the end-of-season Memorial Cup tournament. A set of five individual awards are given for performance at the tournament. In the regular season, Canadian Hockey League also presents ten annual awards. The nominees for each individual award are determined by the winner of the corresponding award handed out by each of the Canadian Hockey League's three member leagues, the Ontario Hockey League, the Quebec Major Junior Hockey League, and the Western Hockey League. 

Each award, and its OHL, QMJHL and WHL equivalent, are listed here.

Canadian Hockey league awards
List of individual awards presented by the Canadian Hockey league.

Memorial Cup awards
List of awards presented at the Memorial Cup.

Member league awards
The CHL's three member leagues also hand out several awards that do not have a CHL equivalent.

Ontario Hockey League

Quebec Major Junior Hockey League

Western Hockey League

See also
List of National Hockey League awards

References

External links
 Canadian Hockey League
 Memorial Cup
 Western Hockey League
 Ontario Hockey League
 Quebec Major Junior Hockey League

  
Canadian ice hockey-related lists